People known for their achievements in different fields have come from the city of Brno, Czech Republic or lived there. They include  scientist Gregor Mendel, who made epochal pea plant experiments,  composer Leoš Janáček, and writer Milan Kundera. Numerous politicians and athletes were also born or lived in the city.

Science and academia 
 Karel Absolon (1877—1960), archaeologist, geographer, paleontologist, and speleologist, custodian of the Moravian Museum, lived in Brno and is buried in the Brno Central Cemetery.
 Leopold Adametz (1861—1941), Austrian zoologist, born in Brno.
 Eugen Böhm von Bawerk (1851—1914), Austrian economist and three-times Minister of Finance, born in Brno.
 Emanuel von Friedrichsthal (1809—1842), Austrian botanist and traveller, born in Brno.
 Kurt Gödel (1906—1978), Austrian logician, mathematician and analytic philosopher, born and grew up at Pekarska 5.
 Johann Gottlieb (1815—1875), Austrian chemist, born in Brno.
 František Graus (1921—1989), Czech-German historian, born in Brno.
 Karl Grobben (1854—1945), Austrian biologist, born in Brno and lived at Lidicka 4/5.
 Ferdinand Ritter von Hebra (1816—1880), Austrian dermatologist, born in Brno.
 Ernst Mach (1838—1916), Austrian physicist and philosopher, born in Brno-Chrlice and lived at Chrlické nam. 1 until the age of 14.
 Gregor Mendel (1822—1884), founder of genetics and Abbot of St Thomas's Abbey, who performed his historic experiments with peas in the monastery gardens. Brno's Mendel Square is named after him.
 Zdeněk Neubauer (1942—2016), philosopher and biologist.
 Peter Newmark (1916-2011), translation scholar.
 George Placzek (1905—1955), physicist (Manhattan project).
 Emil Redlich (1866—1930), Austrian neurologist, born in Brno.
 Heinrich Wilhelm Schott (1794—1865), Austrian botanist, born in Brno.
 Vinoš Sofka (1929—2016), museologist, born in Brno and lived at Havlíčkova 39.
 Pavel Tichý (1936—1994), logician and philosopher, born in Brno.
 Heinrich Wawra von Fernsee (1831—1887), botanist and doctor, born and educated in Brno, and lived at Křenová 36 and Pekařská 53.
 Rudolf Wlassak (1865—1930), Austrian neurologist, born in Brno.
 Viktor Kaplan (1876—1934), Austrian engineer, lived at Úvoz 52 from 1903 to 1931. Kaplan invented the Kaplan turbine in 1909—1912 in laboratories at the Storck factory in Brno.

Government and politics 

 Zuzana Brzobohatá (born 1962), Social Democrat politician, MP (2008—2009) and MEP (2009—2014), born in Brno and educated at the Brno University of Technology.
 Michal Hašek (born 1976), Social Democrat politician, MP (2002—2014) and Governor of South Moravia (2008—2016), born in Brno and educated at the Faculty of Law at Masaryk University.
 Tomáš Julínek (born 1956), doctor, Minister of Health (2007—2009), born in Brno and graduated from Masaryk University in 1982.
 Ondřej Liška (born 1977), Green Party politician, MP (2006—2010) and Minister of Education (2007—2009), born in Brno and educated at Masaryk University.
 Baron Franz von Pillersdorf (1786—1862), Austrian statesman, born in Brno.
 Ferdinand Troyer (1780—1851), Austrian nobleman and amateur clarinetist, born in Brno.
 Milan Uhde (born 1936), playwright, Charter 77 signatory and Civic Democrat politician, Speaker of the Chamber of Deputies of the Czech Republic (1993—1996).

Writers 

 Fritz Grünbaum (1880—1941), Austrian Jewish cabaret artist and composer, born and grew up in Brno.
 František Halas (1901—1949), poet, essayist, and translator, born and raised in Brno-Husovice.
 Bohumil Hrabal (1914—1997), author (Closely Watched Trains, I Served the King of England), born at Balbínova 47, Brno-Židenice.
 Hellmuth Karasek (1934–2015), German poet, novelist, journalist, author and literary critic, born in Brno.
 Milan Kundera (born 1929), Czech-French author (The Unbearable Lightness of Being, The Joke), born at Purkyňova 6, Brno-Královo Pole, educated at Gymnázium třída Kapitána Jaroše.
 Helene Migerka (1867—1928), Austrian poet and novelist, born in Brno.
 David Ernst Oppenheim (1881—1943), Austrian educator and psychologist, born in Brno.
 Fredy Perlman (1934—1985), American author and academic, born in Brno.
 Zdeněk Rotrekl (1920—2013), Catholic poet and literary historian, born in Brno, lived at Jana Uhra 18, studied at Masaryk University's Faculty of Arts, had his funeral at St. Thomas Church.
 Jan Trefulka (1929—2012), writer and literary critic, born in Brno—Kralovo Pole, died in Brno in 2012.
 Kateřina Tučková (born 1980), writer and playwright, born in Brno, educated at Gymnázium třída Kapitána Jaroše and Masaryk University's Faculty of Arts.
 Ernst Weiss (1882—1940), Austrian Jewish physician and author, born and attended gymnasium in Brno.

Musicians and composers 
 Igor Ardašev, pianist
 Josef Berg, composer
 Gustav Brom, big band leader, arranger, clarinetist and composer
 Libuše Domanínská, classical soprano
 Heinrich Wilhelm Ernst, violinist, violist, and composer
 Pavel Haas, composer
 Leoš Janáček, composer
 Maria Jeritza, opera singer
 Vítězslava Kaprálová, composer
 Tereza Kerndlová, singer
 Jiří Kollert, pianist
 Erich Wolfgang Korngold, composer
 Magdalena Kožená, classical mezzo-soprano
 Franz Xaver Neruda, cellist and composer
 Wilma Neruda, violinist
 Jan Škrdlík, cellist

Visual arts 
 Dina Babbitt, Holocaust survivor and artist
 Franta Belsky, WWII veteran and sculptor
 Helena Bochořáková-Dittrichová, graphic artist
 Tamara Divíšková, costume designer and ceramist
 Mathilde Esch, genre painter
 Bohuslav Fuchs, architect
 Jan Kotěra, architect
 Lubo Kristek, sculptor, painter and performer
 Adolf Loos, architect
 Jakub Obrovský
 Antonín Procházka, painter
 Alfred Roller, painter, designer
 Anna Ticho, Israeli artist
 Norbert Troller, architect; artist notable for his portrayal of life in the Theresienstadt concentration camp

Film and theatre 

 Radúz Činčera, screenwriter and director
 Nina Divíšková, actress
 Yana Gupta, actress in Bollywood and Indian regional films
 Hugo Haas, director and actor
 Dagmar Havlová, actress
 Dušan David Pařízek, theatre director
 Libuše Šafránková, actress
 Markéta Štroblová (born 1988), known as Little Caprice, pornographic film actress, born in Brno-Vinohrady.

Sport 

 Jiří Procházka, UFC Fighter
 Karel Abrahám, motorcycle racer
 Zdeněk Blatný, hockey player
 Jaroslav Borák, football player
 Julius Brach, chess master
 Vlastimil Bubník, former ice hockey player and footballer 
 Lukáš Dostál, hockey player
 Richard Farda, hockey player
 Siegfried Flesch (1872–1939), Olympic medalist saber fencer
 Jana Galiková, orienteerer
 Ondřej Hotárek, skater
 Petr Hubáček, hockey player
 Jaroslav Jiřík, hockey player
 Luboš Kalouda, football player
 Renata Kolbovic, tennis player
 Michal Kolomazník, football player
 David Kostelecký, shooter
 Ada Kuchařová, orienteerer
 Tomáš Mica, football player
 Jana Novotná, tennis player
 Adam Ondra, rock climber
 Zdenka Podkapová, former gymnast and model
 Antonín Procházka, former volleyball player
 Lucie Šafářová, tennis player
 Nella Simaová, figure skater
 Zdeněk Svoboda, football player
 Tomáš Vincour, NHL hockey player for the Dallas Stars
 René Wagner, football player
 Pavel Zacha, hockey player
 Jakub Zbořil, NHL hockey prospect for the Boston Bruins
 Emil Zinner, chess master

Religious figures 
 Zvi Dershowitz (b. 1928), conservative rabbi of Sinai Temple, Los Angeles, California
 Mathias Franz Graf von Chorinsky Freiherr von Ledske, first Bishop of the Roman Catholic Diocese of Brno in 1777

Others 
 Freddie Hornik (1944—2009), Brno-born British fashion entrepreneur
 Barbara Lauwers (1914—2009), World War II counter-intelligence officer and recipient of the US Bronze Star Medal, born Božena Hauserová in Brno and studied at Masaryk University. 
 Bedřich Pokorný (1904—1968), Czechoslovak police commander and secret service officer.

References

People
Brno
Brno